The 2022 FIL World Luge Championships were held on 30 January 2022 in Winterberg, Germany. There was only one, non-Olympic discipline of women's doubles.

Results

References

FIL World Luge Championships
World Championships
FIL
Sports competitions in North Rhine-Westphalia
International luge competitions hosted by Germany
FIL